Ian Thomas Henderson (born 24 October 1940) is a former Australian politician.

He was born in Brisbane to Walter Henderson and Lilian Florence May, née Kennedy. He attended state schools at Tin Can Bay, Mooloolaba and Mount Gravatt and then Cavendish Road State High School. He studied at Kelvin Grove Teachers College (Certificate of Teaching), at the University of Queensland (BA, B.Ed, M.Ed.St) and at the University of New England (Litt.B); he also received an Associate Diplomat of Theology from the Australian College of Theology in Melbourne and a Doctorate of Religious Education at the International Bible Institute in Plymouth, Florida. A school teacher from 1962, he became subject master at Mount Gravatt High School in 1977 and deputy principal of Indooroopilly and Springwood high schools from 1980 to 1984. A member of the National Party, he was elected to the Queensland Legislative Assembly as the member for Mount Gravatt in 1983. He was promoted to the front bench as Minister for Justice and Corrective Services in October 1989, but he lost his seat in the election in December at which Labor defeated the National Party.

References

1940 births
Living people
National Party of Australia members of the Parliament of Queensland
Members of the Queensland Legislative Assembly